The 1929 Princeton Tigers football team represented Princeton University in the 1929 college football season. In their 16th year under head coach Bill Roper, the Tigers compiled a 2–4–1 record and were outscored by a total of 67 to 66. 

No Princeton players were selected as first-team honorees on the 1929 All-America college football team or the 1929 All-Eastern football team.

Schedule

References

Princeton
Princeton Tigers football seasons
Princeton Tigers football